Dzitás Municipality (In the Yucatec Maya Language: “plant name: mamay or plantain") is one of the 106 municipalities in the Mexican state of Yucatán containing (456.03 km2) of land and is located roughly 125 km east of the city of Mérida.

History
There is no accurate data on when the town was founded, though it existed before the conquest as part of the province of Cupules. At colonization, Dzitás became part of the encomienda system. What is now known as Dzitas was divided into two different encomiendos. Part was designated to Juan Rodrígez in 1549 and the other to Diego de Alcocer.  In 1579 the first part was held by Juan Rodrígez and Diego de Alcocer and the second by Diego de Alcocer and Francisca Briceño.  The parts were divided between Luis Carrillo de Albornoz and Francisco Rodríguez Montalvo in 1652 and in 1688 between Felipe Carrillo and Isabel Peraza de Ayala.

Yucatán declared its independence from the Spanish Crown in 1821, and in 1825 the area was assigned to the partition of Valladolid Municipality. In 1918 it was designated as its own municipality, but lost a portion of its area in 1931 with the creation of Quintana Roo Municipality.

Governance
The municipal president is elected for a three-year term. The town council has four councilpersons, who serve as Secretary and councilors of public works, public monuments and markets.

Communities
The head of the municipality is Dzitás, Yucatán.  There are 10 populated areas of the municipality with the most important being Dzitás, Dzitcacao, Santa Rosa, Xocempich and Yaxché.  The significant populations are shown below:

Local festivals
Every year from 16 to 22 January is the Festival of Santa Inés, patron saint of the town.

Tourist attractions
 Church of Santa Inés, built in 1870
 Archaeological sites at Chech, Chicche, Distas, Ichmul, Lalul, Popolá and Yanxhacat 
 Cenotes at Anikabil, Ceh Mukul, Chan Dzonot I, Chan Dzonot II, Chicche

References

Municipalities of Yucatán